The Cross Fidei et Virtuti, also referred to as Cross of Mentana, was a decoration for military merit bestowed by the Holy See during the Italian unification.

History
The cross was instituted by Pope Pius IX on 14 November 1867 after the victory of French-Papal troops in the Battle of Mentana. It was not limited to the Battle of Mentana and given to all participants of the campaign against Garibaldi's volunteers.

On 3 March 1868, the Imperial French government authorized the wearing of the medal with French uniforms.

Appearance
The silver cross consists of a cross pattée with concave ends to the arms. A medallion in the centre of the cross bears the Papal arms and the inscription "FIDEI ET VIRTUTI". The arms are inscribed with "PP", "PIUS", "IX", "1867", respectively. 

The cross is suspended from a white ribbon with two light blue stripes in the middle. Medal bars were attached to the ribbon to indicate the different battles that each individual cross was awarded for.

References

 
1867 establishments in the Papal States
1867 disestablishments in the Papal States